Richard Jay Zeckhauser (born 1940) is an American economist and the Frank P. Ramsey Professor of Political Economy at the Kennedy School of Government at Harvard University.

He holds a BA (summa cum laude) and a PhD in economics from Harvard University. Early in his career, he was one of the "whiz kids" assembled by Defense Secretary Robert S. McNamara to apply cutting-edge analysis to Cold War military strategy. He is married to Sally H. Zeckhauser.

He is the author or co-author of many books and over 300 peer-reviewed articles. His most significant works focus on risk management, decision sciences, investment, and policy-making under uncertainty. Zeckhauser introduced the term "ignorance" into decision-making under uncertainty, as in: there's "risk", "uncertainty", and outright "ignorance".

His most recent book, with Peter Schuck, is Targeting in Social Programs. The book examines how and why to deploy scarce public resources to solve public problems. While he holds no formal office, he has long been an informal leader at the Kennedy School and at Harvard. He is also a consultant with Analysis Group. In 1994, he was elected to the Common Cause National Governing Board.

Richwine controversy 
Zeckhauser was on the dissertation committee at Harvard's Kennedy School that awarded former member of The Heritage Foundation Jason Richwine with a Ph.D. for his thesis, "IQ and Immigration Policy". Criticized for the way it linked race to I.Q. levels, the thesis lost Richwine his job at the Foundation.

Bridge career
Zeckhauser is a champion bridge player.

Wins
 North American Bridge Championships (2)
 Blue Ribbon Pairs (1) 1966
 Mixed Pairs (1) 2007

Runners-up
 North American Bridge Championships (2)
 Men's Board-a-Match Teams (1) 1968
 Mixed Board-a-Match Teams (2) 2003, 2012

Significant works
 Summers, Lawrence, and Richard Zeckhauser. "Policymaking for posterity." Journal of Risk and Uncertainty 37.2-3 (2008): 115–140.
 Zeckhauser, Richard. "Investing in the Unknown and Unknowable." (2010): 77–117.
 Samuelson, William, and Richard Zeckhauser. "Status quo bias in decision making." Journal of risk and uncertainty 1, no. 1 (1988): 7–59.
 Zeckhauser, Richard (2006) "Investing in the Unknown and Unknowable", Capitalism and Society: Vol. 1 : Iss. 2, Article 5. 
 Schuck, Peter H. &  Zeckhauser, Richard J. Targeting in Social Programs: Avoiding Bad Bets, Removing Bad Apples, Brookings Institution Press, 2010, 
 Zeckhauser, Richard, Strategy and choice, MIT Press, 1991, 
 Zeckhauser, Richard, Keeney, Ralph L., Sebenius, James K. Wise choices: decisions, games, and negotiations, Harvard Business Press, 1996,

Trivia
Zeckhauser is connected to the so-called Yhprum's law, the opposite of Murphy's law, saying: "Sometimes systems that should not work, work nevertheless."

References

External links
 Official website
 NBER Publications by Richard J. Zeckhauser
  (including 2 as second author 'Richard J.')
 
 Common Cause

1940 births
Date of birth missing (living people)
Place of birth missing (living people)
Harvard College alumni
Harvard Kennedy School faculty
21st-century American economists
Health economists
American contract bridge players
Living people
Negotiation scholars
Fellows of the Econometric Society
Fellows of the American Academy of Arts and Sciences
Distinguished Fellows of the American Economic Association
National Bureau of Economic Research
Harvard Graduate School of Arts and Sciences alumni
Members of the National Academy of Medicine